Ewing High School can refer to:

Ewing High School (Nebraska) in Ewing, Nebraska
Ewing High School (New Jersey) in Ewing, New Jersey